Bara Boarijore is a village in the Boarijore CD block in the Godda subdivision of the Godda district in the Indian state of Jharkhand.

Geography

Location                                             

Overview
Rajmahal coalfield is shown in the map. The entire area is overwhelmingly rural with only small pockets of urbanisation.

Note: The full screen map is interesting. All places marked on the map are linked and you can easily move on to another page of your choice. Enlarge the map to see what else is there – one gets railway links, many more road links and so on.

Demographics
According to the 2011 Census of India, Bara Boarijore had a total population of 2,423, of which 1,195 (49%) were males and 1,228 (51%) were females. Population in the age range 0–6 years was 466. The total number of literate persons in Bara Boarijore was 1,377 (70.36% of the population over 6 years).

Civic administration

Police station
Boarijore police station serves Boarijore CD block.

CD block HQ
Headquarters of Boarijore CD block is at Boarijore village.

Education
Government High School Boarijore is a Hindi-medium coeducational institution established in 1963. It has facilities for teaching from class IX to class XII.

Government Model School Boarijore is an English-medium coeducational school established in 2012. It has facilities for teaching from class VI to class XII.

Kasturba Gandhi Balika Vidyalaya Boarijore is a Hindi-medium, girls only institution established in 2006. It has facilities for teaching from class VI to class XII.

References

Villages in Godda district